Eternal E is the first greatest hits album by American rapper Eazy-E. It was released posthumously in 1995, several months after his death. The RIAA certified the CD Gold for selling over 500,000 copies in the United States on February 21, 2003.

Reception

Entertainment Weekly (12/1/95, p. 77) – "...hits like the groundbreaking 'Boyz-N-the-Hood' and the funky 'We Want Eazy' are enjoyably raw (and music history to boot)." – Rating: B+
Melody Maker (1/13/96, p. 29) – Recommended – "...those old pre-Compton solo tracks...are still the absolute f***ing bomb, even with, in fact, because of, the dated production....[His] was the first voice in hip hop that could be called weak...and thus it was petulantly aggressive in a way that was entirely new."
Rap Pages (2/96, p. 31) – 9 (out of 10) – "...a historical biography of Eazy-E's music that is a must-have for the archives...this compilation documents the life of one of West Coast rap's most important contributors."
NME (1/6/96, p. 33) – 7 (out of 10) – "...is as elegiac as it is capitalistic....[These are] graphic accounts and celebrations of streetlife designed to cause maximum offence to anyone who doesn't try to understand the social context..."

Track listing 

Gangsta Memorial Edition Bonus DVD
 "We Want Eazy"
 "Eazy-er Said Than Dunn"
 "Straight Outta Compton" (Street Version) — N.W.A
 "100 Miles and Runnin'" - N.W.A
 "Appetite for Destruction" (Extended Street Version) — N.W.A
 "Only If You Want It"
 "Real Muthaphuckkin G's" featuring Dresta & B.G. Knocc Out
 "Neighborhood Sniper" (Street Version)
 "Just tah Let U Know"

Certifications

References

1995 greatest hits albums
Compilation albums published posthumously
Eazy-E albums
Gangsta rap compilation albums
Priority Records compilation albums
Ruthless Records compilation albums